Lygodium articulatum, commonly referred to as mangemange or Bushman's mattress, is a fern endemic to the North Island forests of New Zealand. Mangemange is an endemic species and is unique compared to other ferns in the area due to the vine–like curtain it creates in the canopy.  Although the majority of the plant is found in the canopy of the surrounding forest, the roots and stem of mangemange form on the ground, meaning it cannot be classified as an epiphyte.

Description
Lygodium articulatum roots extend laterally from the stem (rhizome) of the plant.  The rhizomes of mangemange are hairy and long-creeping, giving rise to widely spaced fronds. Fronds grow alternately from the stem and form dichotomous costae that twist and climb until they find nearby branches or trees.  Once the plant has the support of a branch, stipes and pinnae form. Mangemange will form either sterile vegetative pinnae (10 cm) or fertile pinnae (1 cm).  Sterile pinnae are flat and smooth while fertile pinnae are wrinkled and fan shaped, terminating in spore structures that release a yellow spore-dust when ripe.

It is often difficult to navigate through due to the strength of the rhizomes.

Distribution and habitat
Mangemange is mainly found on the North Island of New Zealand, specifically in the Northland, Auckland, Volcanic Plateau, Gisborne and Taranaki regions.

Since it is a climbing fern that uses neighboring structures to grow, its habitat is mainly based on the distribution of other species such as the manuka and kanuka scrub, and in kauri, podocarp and broadleaved forest.

Native use
The term "Bushman's mattress" comes from the springiness of the vines and stems of L. articulatum.  The  Māori would make beds by coiling the springy vines and putting them in sacks, then stuff the sacks with available soft flora. Natives also used the tough wiry stems for things like fishhooks, rope, thatching, and eel traps. The leaves and fronds were infused with water and drunk to cure stomach aches and pains.  When dried out, the leaves give off a pleasant aroma and were at times even used as a type of diaper.

References

Flora of the North Island
Ferns of New Zealand
articulatum